Terje Stigen (28 June 1922 – 14 August 2010)  was a Norwegian author.

Biography

Terje Stigen was born on Magerøya in Finnmark, Norway. He  spent part of his childhood in Tromsø. After his final exams at Nordstrand school in Aker during 1941, he studied philology at the University of Oslo, graduating cand.philol. English major  in 1947. 

He wrote 44 novels and short story collections, almost a new year, besides radio plays and numerous articles. Besides novels and short story collections,  he wrote a series of radio plays for Radioteatret. Stigen debuted as an author in 1950 with publication of his novel To døgn. He wrote numerous books, mostly novels, but also a number of lectures and radio dramas. He wrote  in Bokmål, the more common of the two Norwegian languages.  He was a member of the Norwegian Academy for Language and Literature.

Terje Stigen received the Gyldendal's Endowment (Gyldendalprisen) in 1954, the Riksmål Society Literature Prize (Riksmålsprisen)  in 1957 and the Norwegian Booksellers' Prize (Bokhandlerprisen) in 1963.

Bibliography

Novels
1950 To døgn
1952 Skygger på mitt hjerte
1953 Nøkkel til ukjent rom
1954 Før solnedgang
1956 Vindstille underveis
1957 Frode budbæreren
1958 Åsmund Armodsons saga
1959 Stjerneøy
1960 Elskere
1962 Kjærlighet
1964 Til ytterste skjær
1965 Krystallstjernen
1966 Timer i grenseland
1967 Det flyktige hjerte
1968 De tente lys
1969 Det siste paradiset
1970 Besettelse
1971 Kains merke
1972 Min Marion
1973 Skumsøylene
1975 Peter Johannes Lookhas
1975 De faste lys
1976 Forliset
1977 Avikfjord
1978 Huset og byen
1979 Rekviem over en sommer
1980 Øgler i Avikfjord
1981 Blindgjengeren
1983 Bak våre masker
1984 Baldershavn
1986 Ved foten av kunnskapens tre
1987 Katedralen
1989 Krigen
1988 Monolitten
1990 Treskjæreren Johannes
1991 Fyrholmen
1995 Allegretto
1996 Alt er slik det er

Other publications
1953 Vindstille underveis, short story cycle
1953 Norge, text by Terje Stigen, 28 color photographs and 40 black-and-white photos by Bert Boger (Dreyer, Oslo)
1963 Glasskulen, novella collection
1972 Norsk rapsodi: epistler
1974 Den røde sommerfugl og 5 andre hørespill radio drama
1975 De faste lys: norsk reise, travel description
1977 En hekto kandis og andre historier
1982 Assortiment: fortellinger

Drama
1957 Sommernatt, radio drama broadcast by Radioteatret
1958 Strømmen, radio drama
1968 Den røde sommerfugl, radio drama broadcast by Radioteatret
1970 Nødvendigheten, radio drama broadcast by Radioteatret
1970 Batteriet, radio drama broadcast by Radioteatret
1970 Fridagen, video drama broadcast by Fjernsynsteatret

Awards
1954 – Gyldendal's Endowment
1957 – Riksmål Society Literature Prize
1963 – Norwegian Booksellers' Prize
1987 – Nominated for the Nordic Council's Literature Prize

Films based on Terje Stigens novels
1975 Min Marion, directed by Nils R. Müller
1963 Elskere, directed by Nils R. Müller

References

1931 births
2010 deaths
People from Nordkapp
Members of the Norwegian Academy
20th-century Norwegian novelists